Catarina Soares Martins (born 7 September 1973) is a Portuguese politician and actress. She is the national coordinator of the Left Bloc since 2012 and has been a member of the Assembly of the Republic for the Left Bloc since 2009. She trained as a linguist and is active in theater.

Early life and career 
Catarina Martins was born in Porto on 7 September 1973. She did three years of her primary school education in São Tomé and Príncipe and Cape Verde, and returned to Portugal when she was 9 years-old. She enrolled in the Faculty of Law of the University of Coimbra but abandoned her course on the third year. Afterwards she obtained a bachelor's degree in Languages and Literature and a master's degree in Linguistics. She also enrolled in a PhD in Language Teaching.

In 1994, she co-founded the theater company Companhia de Teatro de Visões Úteis in Porto.

Political career
Martins was elected to the Portuguese parliament as the first Left Bloc representative from Porto in the 2009 Portuguese legislative election. On 11 November 2012, Catarina Martins and João Semedo were elected co-coordinators of the Left Bloc, successors to Francisco Louçã. Semedo quit on 30 November 2014 and Martins has been since the sole party coordinator. She was re-elected in the 2015 and 2019 elections. After the 2015 election the Left Bloc and the Portuguese Communist Party (PCP) agreed to support the government formed by António Costa of the Portuguese Socialist Party (PS). On 27 October 2021, the budget proposed by Costa was rejected by the BE and the PCP, leading to early elections. In the January 2022 Portuguese legislative election the BE lost 14 of its 19 seats in the Assembly, although Martins was re-elected in the Porto District constituency.

Personal life 
Martins is married to Pedro Carreira, an actor trained in Physics, and has two daughters.

References

1973 births
20th-century Portuguese actresses
21st-century Portuguese politicians
21st-century Portuguese women politicians
Left Bloc politicians
Living people
People from Porto
Portuguese stage actresses